Virgil Newton (born 17 October 1955) is a Kittitian cricketer. He played in one List A and three first-class matches for the Leeward Islands from 1980 to 1983.

See also
 List of Leeward Islands first-class cricketers

References

External links
 

1955 births
Living people
Kittitian cricketers
Leeward Islands cricketers